Stalin: The Court of the Red Tsar is a 2003 history book by Simon Sebag Montefiore. It primarily deals with the lives of the Soviet leader Joseph Stalin and those around him from the late 1920s through to his death in 1953, covering the period of collectivization, the Moscow show trials, the purges, World War II and the beginning of the Cold War.

The book used previously unseen archival material and Montefiore also conducted interviews with surviving family members from Stalin's inner circle. Montefiore later wrote the companion piece Young Stalin, published in 2007.

See also
 Red Famine: Stalin's War on Ukraine
 Stalin: Breaker of Nations
 Stalin: Paradoxes of Power, 1878-1928
 Stalin: Waiting for Hitler, 1929-1941

References

Biographies (books)
Books about Joseph Stalin
2003 non-fiction books
Cornell University Press books